Priya Satia is an American historian of the British Empire and the Raymond A. Spruance Professor of International History at Stanford University. She received her PhD from the University of California, Berkeley in 2004. Satia grew up in Los Gatos, California.

Publications

References

External links 
 

University of California, Berkeley alumni
Historians of the British Empire
Stanford University faculty
American women historians
People from Los Gatos, California
Year of birth missing (living people)
Living people
Historians from California
21st-century American women writers
21st-century American historians